East Bridgewater Jr./Sr. High School is a public secondary school located at 143 Plymouth Street in East Bridgewater, Massachusetts, United States. The school serves students in grades 7–12 and has an approximate enrollment of 1000 students. The schools colors are Navy, Gold & White and the 
school mascot is the Viking.

History

The school's former campus opened in 1958. In 1975, a major building addition program added extensively to academic support and athletic facilities while doubling the enrollment capacity of the school. Currently, the school enrolls around 1000 students in grades 7–12, reflecting moderate growth over recent years.

Current

A new Jr./Sr. High School opened in fall of 2013. The new school sits on land formerly occupied by the school athletic fields and tennis courts. New fields were constructed on the site of the original building.

A budget was proposed in the spring of 2015 by the overseeing school district, East Bridgewater Public Schools, that would have eliminated all extracurricular programs, including all sports teams and music ensembles and all non essential programs. Students protested the budget and a few students in particular participated in making a short film titled Necessary Extras, a film which acted as a voice to students concerned about the future of the school. The budget was over turned and the teachers of the school were forced to give up their annual union pay raise in order to help fund the programs.

Controversies

Racism 
In 2019, a video was leaked from Snapchat to the internet that displayed multiple East Bridgewater High School students in blackface and saying "what's up my nigga" and "nigger". The school had sent out an email stating that, "this will not be a one and done discussion". After the email was sent out, multiple stories came out about how they have had similar experiences in the school in years past.

Chromebook fire 
In 2017, an 8th grade student twisted the camera on their school-issued chromebook, leading to wires tangling and a small electrical fire. The school recalled all student chromebooks, replacing them with a model that did not allow for the camera to be twisted.

Athletic

East Bridgewater has an athletic program.

Music
The East Bridgewater High School Marching Band was an undefeated champion in Division One of the New England Scholastic Band Association from the late 1990s until 2010. The music department slogan is, "The Tradition of Excellence". The group has performed shows featuring music from feature films such as: The Patriot, Pirates of the Caribbean, Sky Captain and the World of Tomorrow, and Hook. They've also performed music by popular bands such as: Styx, Chicago, and Steely Dan.

Notable alumni

Joe Lauzon - professional mixed martial artist, current UFC competitor in the Lightweight Division
 David Lorayne - politician

See also
High school (North America)
Education in the United States

References

External links
East Bridgewater Public Schools
East Bridgewater High School's website

Schools in Plymouth County, Massachusetts
Public high schools in Massachusetts
East Bridgewater, Massachusetts